Kevin Landrigan was a Nashua Telegraph columnist. His column appeared in the Sunday paper and was a lengthy look at the New Hampshire State House. He was described by the paper's website as "The Telegraph's Eyes and Ears in Concord."

See also
New Hampshire State House press

External links
Telegraph website profile

American male journalists
Year of birth missing (living people)
Living people
Place of birth missing (living people)